Governor Sharpe may refer to:

Alfred Sharpe (1853–1935), 1st Governor of Nyasaland from 1907 to 1910
Horatio Sharpe (1718–1790), 22nd Proprietary Governor of Maryland from 1753 to 1768